Heterelmis obesa is a species of riffle beetle in the family Elmidae. It is found in Central America, North America, and South America.

Subspecies
These two subspecies belong to the species Heterelmis obesa:
 Heterelmis obesa obesa
 Heterelmis obesa plana Hinton, 1936

References

Further reading

 
 

Elmidae
Articles created by Qbugbot
Beetles described in 1882